Alan Irvine may refer to:

 Alan Irvine (footballer, born 1958), former Everton and Crystal Palace player, and former manager of West Bromwich Albion
 Alan Irvine (footballer, born 1962), former Falkirk player and older brother of Brian Irvine
 Alan Irvine (designer), RDI-awarded for his exhibition and museum design